The 2011–12 Moldovan National Division (Moldovan: Divizia Națională) was the 21st season of top-tier football in Moldova. The competition began on 23 July 2011 and ended on 23 May 2012.

The league was competed by 12 teams and won by Sheriff Tiraspol. Dacia Chișinău, Zimbru Chișinău and, as winners of the 2011–12 Moldovan Cup, Milsami Orhei gained places in the qualification rounds of 2012–13 UEFA Europa League. CSCA–Rapid Chișinău and FC Costuleni were originally relegated on competitive grounds, but were both spared later after Sfintul Gheorghe Suruceni did not obtain a National Division licence for 2012–13 and only one team could be promoted from the 2011–12 A Division on the same grounds.

Teams
The number of teams in the league was decreased from 14 to 12. Placed last in the previous season, Găgăuzia Comrat and Dinamo Bender had not completed their licensing to compete in the Moldovan National Division and were relegated. Neither could the first four placed teams in the 2010–11 Moldovan "A" Division: Locomotiv Bălți, Ursidos Chișinău, Dinamo-Auto and Intersport-Aroma, therefore no teams were promoted.

Stadia and locations

League table

Round by round

Results
The schedule consists of three rounds. During the first two rounds, each team plays each other once home and away for a total of 22 matches. The pairings of the third round will then be set according to the standings after the first two rounds, giving every team a third game against each opponent for a total of 33 games per team.

First and second round

Third round
Key numbers for pairing determination (number marks position after 22 games):

Top goalscorers
Updated to matches played on 21 April 2013. 

7 goals (5 players)

  Maxim Antoniuc (FC Iskra-Stal)
  Anatolii Cheptine (FC Sheriff Tiraspol)
  Eugen Gorodețchi (FC Iskra-Stal)
  Ademar Xavier (FC Milsami)
  Volodymyr Kilikevych (FC Iskra-Stal)

6 goals (2 players)

  Radu Gînsari (FC Academia Chișinău)
  Gheorghe Ovseannicov (FC Olimpia)

5 goals (4 players)

  Adrian Grigoruță (FC Milsami)
  Alexandru S. Grosu (FC Tiraspol)
  Ousmane Traoré (FC Milsami)
  Yevhen Zarichnyuk (FC Tiraspol)

4 goals (9 players)

  Jean Bouli (FC Olimpia)
  Igor Costrov (FC Tiraspol)
  Artem Kozlov (FC Olimpia)
  Cătălin Lichioiu (FC Nistru Otaci)
  Iurie Livandovschi (FC Academia Chișinău)
  Jude Ogada (FC Olimpia)
  Mihail Plătică (FC Academia Chișinău)
  Alexandru Popovici (FC Tiraspol)
  Claudiu Octavian Vâlcu (FC Nistru Otaci)

3 goals (25 players)

  Valeriu Ciupercă (FC Academia Chișinău)
  Roland Bilala (FC Tiraspol)
  Matviy Bobal (FC Dacia Chișinău)
  Alexandru Cucu (FC Sfîntul Gheorghe)
  Sergiu Cuznețov (Zimbru Chișinău)
  Célio Santos (FC Dacia Chișinău)
  Serghei Gheorghiev (Sheriff Tiraspol)
  Alexandru Golban (FC Milsami)
  Victor Gonța (FC Costuleni)
  Adama Guira (FC Dacia Chișinău)
  Serghei Epureanu (FC Nistru Otaci)
  Marcel Metoua (Sheriff Tiraspol)
  Aleksandr Nechayev (FC Dacia Chișinău)
  Daniil Nikolaev (Zimbru Chișinău)
  Andrei Novicov (FC Iskra-Stal)
  Darwin Ríos (Sheriff Tiraspol)
  Marius Robert Roman (FC Academia Chişinău)
  Miral Samardžić (FC Sheriff Tiraspol)
  Marian Stoleru (FC Milsami)
  Vazha Tarkhnishvili (FC Sheriff Tiraspol)
  Alexandru Tcaciuc (FC Nistru Otaci)
  Victor Truhanov (FC Iskra-Stal)
  Mihai Ţurcan (FC Tiraspol)
  Sergiu Zacon (FC Nistru Otaci)
  Nail Zamaliyev (Sheriff Tiraspol)

2 goals (40 players)

  Babatunde Ajibola (FC Olimpia)
  Dumitru Bacal (Rapid Ghidighici)
  Alexandru Bălțoi (Rapid Ghidighici)
  Denis Banari (FC Nistru Otaci)
  Akhmet Barakhoyev (FC Zimbru Chișinău)
  Andrian Cașcaval (FC Academia Chișinău)
  Serhiy Chebotayev (FC Iskra-Stal)
  Oleg Clonin (Rapid Ghidighici)
  Alexandr Cucerenco (FC Nistru Otaci)
  Jhonatan Pereira (FC Sheriff Tiraspol)
  Cristian Daminuță (FC Tiraspol)
  Maxwell Egwuatu (FC Costuleni)
  Rafael Wellington Pérez (FC Milsami)
  Valentin Furdui (FC Milsami)
  Caio Suguino (FC Milsami)
  Cornel Gheți (FC Milsami)
  Alexandru A. Grosu (FC Tiraspol)
  Serghei Istrati (FC Academia Chișinău)
  Ion Jardan (Rapid Ghidighici)
  Alexei Josan (Rapid Ghidighici)
  Levan Korgalidze (FC Zimbru Chișinău)
  Anton Kovalevsky (FC Zimbru Chișinău)
  Maxim Kuba (FC Olimpia)
  Igor Lambarschi (FC Academia Chișinău)
  Sergiu Mocanu (FC Costuleni)
  Renat Murguleț (FC Nistru Otaci)
  Denis Omerbegovic (Rapid Ghidighici)
  Octavian Onofrei (FC Costuleni)
  Serghei Pogreban (FC Nistru Otaci)
  German Pyatnikov (FC Nistru Otaci)
  Alexandru Răilean (FC Sfîntul Gheorghe)
  Yakup Sertkaya (FC Costuleni)
  Sandro Shugladze (FC Iskra-Stal)
  Eugen Sidorenco (FC Zimbru Chișinău)
  Oleg Șișchin (FC Zimbru Chișinău)
  Alfredo Rafael Sosa (FC Sheriff Tiraspol)
  Tudor Starciuc (Rapid Ghidighici)
  Slaven Stjepanović (FC Dacia Chișinău)
  Ion Ursu (FC Sfîntul Gheorghe)

1 goals (62 players)

  Oleg Andronic (FC Academia Chișinău)
  Daniel Akhtyamov (FC Tiraspol)
  Kemal Alomerović (FC Dacia Chișinău)
  Daniel Bălașa (FC Zimbru Chișinău)
  Daniel Barna (Rapid Ghidighici)
  Vitalie Bulat (FC Tiraspol)
  Victor Bulat (FC Tiraspol)
  Iulian Bursuc (FC Sfîntul Gheorghe)
  Marius Călin (Rapid Ghidighici)
  Adrian Caragea (FC Nistru Otaci)
  Vasile Carauș (FC Dacia Chișinău)
  Vadim Cemîrtan (FC Academia Chișinău)
  Andrei Ciofu (FC Milsami)
  Vadim Clipca (FC Olimpia)
  Andrei Cojocari (FC Dacia Chişinău)
  Vinicius Fabbron (FC Zimbru Chișinău)
  Fred Nélson de Olivera (FC Tiraspol)
  Alexandru Dedov (FC Sheriff Tiraspol)
  Kirill Erokhin (FC Sfîntul Gheorghe)
  Valerian Gârlă (FC Milsami)
  Mykyta Gavrylenko (FC Iskra-Stal)
  Dumitru Gliga (FC Costuleni)
  Eugen Gorceac (FC Sfîntul Gheorghe)
  Eduard Grosu (FC Sfîntul Gheorghe)
  Sergiu Gusacov (FC Olimpia)
  Jean-Robens Jerome (FC Olimpia)
  Kouadio Kouassi (FC Costuleni)
  Thomas Kourouma (FC Olimpia)
  Valentin Lungu (FC Costuleni)
  Aleksey Lyubushkin (FC Academia Chișinău)
  Vitalie Manaliu (Rapid Ghidighici)
  Vitalie Mardari (FC Milsami)
  Sergiu Matei (FC Sfîntul Gheorghe)
  Alexandr Muzîciuc (FC Nistru Otaci)
  Gheorghe Nicologlo (FC Tiraspol)
  Yusif Nurudeen (FC Costuleni)
  Nicolae Orlovschi (FC Olimpia)
  Alexandr Pașcenco (Rapid Ghidighici)
  Daniel Pîslă (FC Olimpia)
  Vitalie Plămădeală (FC Zimbru Chișinău)
  Veaceslav Posmac (FC Sfîntul Gheorghe)
  Maxim Potîrniche (FC Academia Chișinău)
  Vladimir Potlog (FC Academia Chişinău)
  Denis Rassulov (FC Milsami)
  Vadim Rață (FC Sheriff Tiraspol)
  Vasile Rusu (Rapid Ghidighici)
  Aleš Šuster (FC Zimbru Chișinău)
  Alexandru Scripcenco (FC Iskra-Stal)
  Vasyl Shehda (FC Nistru Otaci)
  Eugen Slivca (FC Zimbru Chișinău)
  Veaceslav Sofroni (FC Costuleni)
  Maxim Șoimu (FC Costuleni)
  Andrei Solodchi (FC Costuleni)
  Adrian Sosnovschi (FC Milsami)
  Osman Sow (FC Dacia Chișinău)
  Andrei Tcaciuc (FC Sfîntul Gheorghe)
  Alexandru Tofan (Rapid Ghidighici)
  Abu Tommy (FC Sheriff Tiraspol)
  Janko Tumbasević (FC Dacia Chișinău)
  Timur Vâlcu (FC Costuleni)
  Dmitrii Vornișel (FC Tiraspol)
  Vadim Yerchuk (FC Sfîntul Gheorghe)

Hat-tricks

Clean sheets

Disciplinary
Final classification.

References

External links
Official website

1
Moldovan Super Liga seasons
Mol